Admetus (Gr. ) was a Greek epigrammatist who lived in the early part of the 2nd century AD.  One of his lines is preserved by Lucian.

References

Ancient Greek epigrammatists
Roman-era Greeks
2nd-century poets
Ancient Greek writers known only from secondary sources